Geir "Bolla" Johansen (born 7 July 1960) is a retired Norwegian football midfielder.

He played for Eik-Tønsberg most of the 1980s, but joined Moss FK ahead of the 1988 season. The reigning champions, Moss tried their luck in the 1988–89 European Cup but was knocked out by Real Madrid. In 1990 Johansen rejoined Eik. Ahead of the 1994 season he went on to minnows IL Ivrig.

Johansen was capped four times for Norway. He later managed Eik-Tønsberg.

References

1960 births
Living people
Norwegian footballers
Eik-Tønsberg players
Moss FK players
Norway under-21 international footballers
Norway international footballers
Place of birth missing (living people)

Association football midfielders